An unergative verb is an intransitive verb that is characterized semantically by having a subject argument which is an agent that actively initiates the action expressed by the verb.

For example, in English, talk and resign in the sentence "You talk and you resign" are unergative verbs, since they are intransitive (one does not say "you talk someone") and "you" are the initiator or responsible for talking and resigning.  

But fall and die in the sentence "They fall and die" are unaccusative verbs, since usually they are not responsible for falling or dying but still the verb is intransitive, meaning it is comprehensively used without a direct object. (They cannot "fall something" or "die someone").

Some languages treat unergative verbs differently from other intransitives in morphosyntactic terms. For example, in some Romance languages, such verbs use different auxiliaries when in compound tenses.

Besides the above, unergative verbs differ from unaccusative verbs in that in some languages, they can occasionally use the passive voice.

In Dutch, for example, unergatives take  (to have) in the perfect tenses:

"I call (by phone). – I have called."

In such cases, a transition to an impersonal passive construction is possible by using the adverb er, which functions as a dummy subject and the passive auxiliary :

literally, "*There is by Jan telephoned." (meaning "A telephone call by Jan is going on.")

By contrast, Dutch ergative verbs take  ("to be") in the perfect tenses:

"The grease solidifies – The grease has solidified."

In other words, unergatives are truly intransitive, but ergatives are not.

See also
Ambitransitive verb
Ergative verb
Unaccusative verb

References

Transitivity and valency
Syntax–semantics interface